Mathunny Mathews (Toyota Sunny) (1936-2017) was an Indian, a resident in Kuwait and was one of the people credited with the safe airlift evacuation of about 170,000 Indians from Kuwait during the 1990 Invasion of Kuwait, which is hailed as the world's largest air civilian evacuation in history.

Early life 
Matthews was born in 1936. He hails from Kerala (Eraviperoor), Kumbanad, India and was popularly known as Toyota Sunny, owing to his work in Kuwait with the Toyota agency owned by the Al-Sayer Group. He retired in 1989 as its MD. During the early phase of industrialization in Kuwait, Matthews had reached Kuwait by ship in 1956 as a prospective immigrant for employment. He was also the chairman of the Jabriya Indian School in Kuwait and one of the founding members of the Indian Art’s Circle, a widely recognized cultural association of all Indian expatriates in Kuwait.

Indian Airlift Evacuation 

With the help of Mathunny Mathews, the airlift of Indians was carried out from 13 August to 11 October 1990 after the Invasion of Kuwait. Air India holds the Guinness Book of World Records for the most people evacuated by a civil airliner as a result of this effort. The operation was carried out during the Persian Gulf War in 1990 to evacuate Indian expatriates from Kuwait and Iraq. It is believed to be the largest civilian evacuation in history. The Indians based in Kuwait also helped in the evacuation efforts. Leading daily Times of India reported that Kuwait-based Malayali entrepreneur Mathunny Mathews (also known as Toyota Sunny) duly supported by Harbhajan Singh Vedi, played a stellar role in co-ordinating the evacuation operation by meeting Indian ambassador in Baghdad and overseeing the transport of thousands of Indians to Amman via Baghdad by bus after striking a deal with Iraqi transporters, Indian authorities and UN. On 22 January 2016, Airlift, a Hindi film playing Akshay Kumar as Ranjit Katyal, a fictional character somewhat merged character based on Mathunny Mathews and Harbhajan Singh Vedi was released.

References

1990 in India
Evacuations of Indians
Airlifts
Gulf War
India–Kuwait relations
Air India
1990 in aviation
Year of birth missing
2017 deaths